Fasiledes Stadium (Amharic: ፋሲልደስ ስታዲየም) is a stadium in Gonder, Ethiopia.

History 
The stadium is named after Emperor Fasiledes. The stadium is home to Fasil Kenema SC and until 2016 Dashen Beer FC. The stadium has hosted Ethiopian Premier League matches.

References 

Football venues in Ethiopia